Sklenička (feminine Skleničková) is a Czech surname meaning "small glass". Notable people include:

 Carol Sklenicka, American essayist
 David Sklenička, Czech ice hockey player
 Miroslava Skleničková, Czech gymnast
 Petr Sklenička, Czech environmentalist

Czech-language surnames